Menippe nodifrons, the Cuban stone crab, is a species of crab found in tropical warm waters in the west Atlantic Ocean. It is common in parts of Brazil, occurring in the United States in east-central Florida  and on energy platforms off Louisiana’s coast.

References

Eriphioidea
Crustaceans of the Atlantic Ocean
Crustaceans described in 1859
Taxa named by William Stimpson